The 2019 Mole Valley District Council election took place on 2 May 2019 to elect approximately one-third of members to Mole Valley District Council in England, coinciding with other local elections held simultaneously across 248 councils in England and all 11 councils in Northern Ireland. The 2019 Mole Valley local election outcomes are outlined below in the summary results chart and the detailed results charts for each ward. The 2019 election results are compared (in terms of percentage points gained or lost) against the results when these wards were last contested four years previously, on the same day as the General Election of May 2015. The difference in the results for certain political parties is stark. This is largely influenced by an excellent result for the Conservatives on their general election winning day in May 2015, but a terrible result for the Conservatives in May 2019 when, nationally, the Government of Theresa May had failed to ‘deliver Brexit’ by the anticipated date of 29 March 2019. But even taking the national backdrops of these two very different local elections into account, it was still a spectacularly poor set of results for the Conservatives in Mole Valley in these 2019 local elections and a very good set of results for the Liberal Democrats.  Some Mole Valley wards did not hold a local election in 2019, being contested instead in even-numbered years.

Summary of Results

Results by Ward

Ashtead Village

Beare Green

Bookham North

Bookham South

Box Hill & Headley

Brockham, Betchworth and Buckland

Capel, Leigh and Newdigate

Charlwood

Dorking South

Holmwoods

Leatherhead North

Leith Hill

Mickleham, Westhumble & Pixham
		

Note: David Campbell Irvine was the sitting councillor, having been elected as a Conservative in 2015.

Okewood

References 

Mole Valley
Mole Valley District Council elections
May 2019 events in the United Kingdom
2010s in Surrey